The 2019–20 Arizona Wildcats women's basketball team represented University of Arizona during the 2019–20 NCAA Division I women's basketball season. The Wildcats, led by fourth-year head coach Adia Barnes, played their home games at the McKale Center and are members of the Pac-12 Conference.

Previous season
They finished the season 24–13, 7–11 in Pac-12 play to finish in a tie for sixth place. They advanced to the quarterfinals of the Pac-12 women's tournament where they lost to Oregon. They received an at-large bid to the Women's National Invitation Tournament, where they advanced to the finals and defeated Northwestern for the championship.

Roster

Schedule

|-
!colspan=9 style=| Exhibition

|-
!colspan=9 style=| Non-conference regular season

|-
!colspan=9 style=| Pac-12 regular season

|-
!colspan=9 style=|Pac-12 Women's Tournament

Rankings

See also
2019–20 Arizona Wildcats men's basketball team

References

Arizona Wildcats women's basketball seasons
Arizona
Arizona Wildcats women's basketball
Arizona Wildcats women's basketball